Juana Díaz is a town and municipality of Puerto Rico located in the southern coast of the island, south of Jayuya, Ciales, Orocovis and Villalba; east of Ponce; and west of Coamo and Santa Isabel and the Caribbean Sea to the south. Juana Díaz is spread over 13 barrios and Juana Diaz Pueblo (the downtown area and the administrative center of the city). It is part of the Ponce Metropolitan Statistical Area.

Juana Díaz is known as "La Ciudad del Mabí" (Mabí City). Mabi is a fermented Taíno beverage made out from the bark of the mabi tree Colubrina elliptica.

History
The civil government of this territory was established on April 25, 1798.

Puerto Rico was ceded by Spain in the aftermath of the Spanish–American War under the terms of the Treaty of Paris of 1898 and became a territory of the United States. In 1899, the United States Department of War conducted a census of Puerto Rico finding that the population of Juana Díaz was 27,896.

On September 20, 2017 Hurricane Maria struck the island of Puerto Rico. In Juana Díaz, 2,500 homes lost their roof.

Geography
Juana Díaz is located on the southern coast. Several rivers run through the Juana Díaz territory, among them, Río Inabón and the Río Jacaguas, from which Juana Díaz takes it's nickname, "Ciudad del Jacaguas". The Guayabal dam between Juana Díaz and Villalba is located in this river. Among its main tributaries are Río Toa Vaca in Villalba, also dammed. Both Guayabal and Toa Vaca lakes are visible in the map. Lake Toa Vaca is also the main source of drinking water for Juana Díaz, Ponce and other towns. The highest point in the municipality is located close to the top of Cerro Maravilla.

Barrios

Like all municipalities of Puerto Rico, Juana Díaz is subdivided into barrios.

Amuelas
Callabo
Capitanejo
Cintrona
Collores
Emajagual
Guayabal
Jacaguas
Juana Díaz barrio-pueblo
Lomas
Río Cañas Abajo
Río Cañas Arriba
Sabana Llana
Tijeras

Sectors
Barrios (which are like minor civil divisions) 
and subbarrios, in turn, are further subdivided into smaller local populated place areas/units called sectores (sectors in English). The types of sectores may vary, from normally sector to urbanización to reparto to barriada to residencial, among others.

Special Communities

 (Special Communities of Puerto Rico) are marginalized communities whose citizens are experiencing a certain amount of social exclusion. A map shows these communities occur in nearly every municipality of the commonwealth. Of the 742 places that were on the list in 2014, the following barrios, communities, sectors, or neighborhoods were in Juana Díaz: Arús (Pastillito), Callejón de los Perros (Los Buenos), Sector San Carlos in Collores, Sector Baldío in Cuevas, La Atómica, Las Palmas and Manzanilla.

Demographics

Tourism

Landmarks and places of interest
There are 30 beaches in Juana Díaz.
 Guayabal Reservoir
Holy Kings Monument
 (Three Kings Museum)
Lucero Cave
Plaza Román Baldorioty de Castro
Schoenstatt Shrine

Economy

Agriculture
In the past, Juana Díaz was a large producer of sugarcane but with industrial development the sugar cane industry disappeared. Local rums are now produced from raw materials imported from other countries. Juana Díaz produces plantains, bananas, mangoes, and other crops that are consumed in the local markets and also exported to other countries. Cattle and pigs are also raised in local farms.

Industry
Juana Díaz is a producer of beige marble, one of the finest marbles in the world.

Culture

Festivals and events
Juana Díaz celebrates its patron saint festival in late August / early September. The  is a religious and cultural celebration that generally features parades, games, artisans, amusement rides, regional food, and live entertainment.

Other festivals and events celebrated in Juana Díaz include:
Three Kings Festival - January 6 - religious and cultural event which began in 1884 celebrating the visit of the Three Kings to baby Jesus. The main event is a parade down Comercio Street to the town's plaza where a big altar is set up for the celebration of the Holy Eucharist. The Eucharist begins with an act of the Prophets announcing the coming of the Messiah. The prophesies are followed by the sighting of three kings by the shepherds. The holy mass follows and at the end the Three Kings find and adore baby Jesus. Some people come to the festival dressed up as shepherds.
  (Mauby Festival) - March
Bull Frog Festival - April
Good Friday - Juana Díaz celebrates many activities during Holy Week each year. The most notable is the Good Friday procession that transits through many of the urban communities with representations of the Stations of the Cross. Thousands of juanadinos and people from other towns visit Juana Díaz on Good Friday.
Llorensiana Week - May
Puerto Rican Festivities - December

Government

Like all municipalities in Puerto Rico, Juana Díaz is administered by a mayor. The current mayor is Ramón Hernández Torres, from the Popular Democratic Party (PPD). Hernández was elected at the 2000 general election.

Part of the city belongs to the Puerto Rico Senatorial district V, which is represented by two senators. In 2012, Ramón Ruiz and Martín Vargas Morales, from the Popular Democratic Party, were elected as district senators. The other part of the city belongs to the Puerto Rico Senatorial district VI, which has been represented by Miguel Pereira Castillo and Angel M. Rodríguez since 2012.

Symbols
The  has an official flag and coat of arms.

Flag
The flag of Juana Díaz is rectangular in shape, formed by two triangles whose hypotenuse extends from the upper left corner to the lower right corner. The upper triangle is white, the symbol of silver and the lower triangle is yellow or gold. At its center is the coat of arms of Juana Díaz in its natural colors.

Coat of arms
The coat of arms features The Nazarene Cross. It is in the center of the coat of arms. It stands out subtly between furrows and space, symbolizing the union of two races by means of the inalienable bond of the Christian faith. The cross also symbolizes the western Christian culture.

The woman represents - Mrs. Juana Díaz, the towns namesake - with her hands the woman strews thirteen grains of corn into thirteen furrows, symbolizing the seeds that germinated and were the base for the foundation and growth of our town. The woman dresses as those of her time.

The sun symbolizes a new horizon, hope in the formation of a town. The sun within the coat of arms has thirteen rays, each represents one of the barrios of Juana Díaz.

Thirteen knolls stand out in the coat of arms symbolizing each of the thirteen barrios or barrios of Juana Díaz. The mountains also symbolize that Juana Díaz has been one of the richest mineral towns in Puerto Rico.

The Indians represents the natives who settled the village before the arrival of the white man. The native carries on his back thirteen sheathed arrows and a bow, and an arrow on his head. The bow and arrow represent the only effective means of defense useful for survival.

The shackle and the whip represent Juana Díaz as the martyr of 1887 because the most heinous, repressive institution known at the time was enforced in our town, "El Componte". It was in Juana Díaz where liberal politicians and dedicated patriots were martyred because they fought against the tyranny imposed by Spanish General Romualdo Palacios. Palacios was the most tyrannical and cruel of all the governors of our nation. "El Componte", a military tribunal, was used to quiet the rebel voices of those who loved law and order.

The harp represents the music, the quill pen dipped in the ink well represents the verse, the poetry. Juana Díaz has generously given distinguished poets to Puerto Rican literature.

Ciudad del Jacaguas is the name by which Juana Díaz was known in the past. Many people knew Juana Díaz as the city of Jacaguas, but Luis Lloréns Torres dubbed it "La Versalles de Ponce" (Ponce's Versailles).

Four Castles Represent that Juana Díaz reached the stature of city. Cities have five castles in their coat of arms, villages have four and smaller towns have three.

Transportation
Among the most important roads in Juana Díaz are the Luis A. Ferré Expressway (PR-52) which connects Juana Díaz to Ponce and the airport in just minutes and San Juan in a little more than one hour. Other important roads include road PR-14 which runs through downtown Juana Díaz on its route between Ponce and Cayey, road PR-149 from Juana Díaz to Manatí running through Villalba and the "Cordillera Central" and road PR-1 which goes from Ponce to San Juan through barrio Pastillo in the south coast of Juana Díaz.

There are 51 bridges in Juana Díaz.

Notable "Juanadinos"

Natives of the Juana Diaz are referred to as "Juanadinos" within Puerto Rico. Among the most notable Juanadinos are:

Tito Gomez- Salsa singer, known for his work with Ray Barretto, La Sonora Ponceña and Grupo Niche

Luis Lloréns Torres- Famous Puerto Rican poet and essayist

Guillermo Jose Torres- Puerto Rican reporter and news anchorman

Hector Tricoche- Salsa singer known for his work as the lead singer for the Tommy Olivencia Orchestra

Yayo El Indio - Salsa singer

Gallery

See also

List of Puerto Ricans
History of Puerto Rico
Did you know-Puerto Rico?
Municipalities of Puerto Rico

References

External links
 Juana Díaz and its barrios, United States Census Bureau
 Puerto Rico Government Directory - Juana Díaz

 
Municipalities of Puerto Rico
Populated coastal places in Puerto Rico
Populated places established in 1798
Ponce metropolitan area